George Antony, popularly credited as Spadikam George is an Indian actor who primarily works in Malayalam films. He came to the limelight with the 1995 film Spadikam, after which his name was preceded by the name of that film. George's performance in the film won him good reviews as his antagonist role opposite Mohanlal was an unprecedented success. Even though he never got another author-backed role, he has done important characters including comic roles in his later releases.

George has also done prominent roles in documentaries, the most notable being Messenger, a short film produced by the De Paul Public School in Kottayam which is under the ownership of the Vincentian Family.

Personal life
He is married to Thresiamma. The couple have five children, Ashwathi, Anu, Ajo, Anjali and Anju. They are settled in Bangalore.

Filmography

1989 Swantham Ennu Karuthi
1990 Marupuram
1991 Post Box No. 27
1993 Kanyakumariyil Oru Kavitha
1993 Chenkol
1994 Pakshe
1994 Moonnam Loka Pattalam (The Porter) as Antappan
1995 Puthukkottayile Puthumanavalan as Sreedharanunni 
1995 Thumbolikadappuram
1995 Sadaram as Police Officer 
1995 Highway
1995 Spadikam as Kuttikkadan 
1995 Vajram (Telugu)
1996 Azhakiya Ravanan as himself
1996 Aayiram Naavulla Ananthan as Jacob 
1996 Yuvathurki as S.I Paasha
1996 Sathyabhaamaykkoru Pranayalekhanam as Chandrasekhara Varma
1996 Kinnam Katta Kallan1996 The Prince as Rajasekharan
1996 Man Of The Match as Krishnakumar 
1996 Swarnakireedam as Sethurama Iyer 
1997 Manthra Mothiram as George Antony 
1997 Swantham Makalkku Snehapoorvam1997Superman as Jaganathan
1997 "Ancharakalyanam
1997 Ikkareyanente Manasam as Pattalam Raghavan
1997 Poomarathanalil as Sethunath 
1997 Moonu Kodiyum Munnooru Pavanum as Gunda Lazer
1997 Lelam as Kadayadi Baby
1998 Vismayam as Ambujaksha Kurup 
1998 Elavamkodu Desam as Idicheman 
1998 Meenakshi Kalyanam1999 Vazhunnor as Andrews 
1999 Udayapuram Sulthan as Sreekanta Varma 
1999 The Godman as G. K. Krishnan 
1999 Crime File as Cardinal Carlose 
1999 Ezhupunna Tharakan1999 Panchapandavar as Sunnychan 
1999 Olympiyan Anthony Adam as IG Kora
1999 Onnaamvattam Kandappol1999 Aakasha Ganga as Maanikkasheri Thampuran, Devan's father
1999 Pathram as Thomas Vazhakkali
2000 Aanmuttathe Angalamar as Hareendran Nair
2000 India Gate as Vavachan
2000 Ival Doupathi
2000 Rapid Action Force as Chief Minister
2000 Narasimham as Kalletti Vasudevan 
2000 Sathyameva Jayathe
2000 Thenkasipattanam as Devarajan 
2001 Nariman as Thomas Philipose 
2001 Nagaravadhu as Sivanandan 
2001 Koodariyathe
2001 Ee Nadu Innalevare 
2001 Rakshasa Rajavu
2001 Thenthulli
2002 Puthooramputhri Unniyarcha as Aringodar
2002 Thaandavam as Kuruvilla Alex 
2002 Randu Penkuttikal
2002 Adheena
2002 Kanalkireedam
2002 Kunjikoonan as Lakshmi's father 
2003 Swantham Malavika as Thomas John
2003 Mazhanoolkkanavu 
2003 Cheri
2004 Priyam Priyamkaram
2004  Natturajavu as Ouseppu
2004 Vettom as Police Officer 
2004 C. I. Mahadevan 5 Adi 4 Inchu  as DYSP
2004 Kusruthi as Carlos
2004  Thalamelam  as Jabbar's Uncle 
2004 Kanninum Kannadikkum as himself
2005 Thaskara Veeran as Itty 
2005 Isra as Wills Pappachan
2005 Boy Friend
2005 Maanikyan
2005 Chandrolsavam as Kurien 
2006 Pothan Vava as Antochan 
2006 Ashwaroodan as Theeppori Thampi
2006 Arunam
2006 The Don as Anirudhan 
2006 Keerthichakra as Krishnakumar
2006 Highway Police as Chandra Das
2006 Raashtram as ACP Adiyodi 
2006 Balram vs. Tharadas
2007 Mayavi as Police Officer 
2007 Avan Chandiyude Makan as CI Shivanandan
2007 November Rain (2007 film) as Saravanan
2007 Chocolate as Balachandran 
2007 Hallo as Vadakkancherry Vakkachan 
2008 Roudram as Veerabhadra Kurup 
2008 Kovalam  as Ratnakaran Nair
2008 Mohitham
2009 Pramukhan
2009 Ee Pattanathil Bhootham as P.R.O. Ramanathan
2010 Yakshiyum Njanumas Meledathu Madhavan 
2011 Raghuvinte Swantham Raziya
2011 Happy Darbar
2011 Manushya Mrugamas George 
2012 Simhasanam
2012 Vaidooryam
2012 Mayamohini as SP Raghavan
2012 The King And The Commissioner as DSP Koshy
2013 Proprietors: Kammath & Kammath as Varkeychan
2013 Blackberry 
2013 Police Maman as S.P. Anand Kumar 
2013 My Fan Ramu
2015 Moonam nal
2018 Lolans
2018 Carbon as Sebastian
2018 Shikkari Shambhu as Mathews
2018 Abrahaminte Santhathikal as Jacob
2018 Chalakkudikkaran Changathi
2019 Kuttymama
2019 Neermathalam Pootha Kalam
2019  Prasnapariharashala
2019 Brother's Day
 Aalkoottathil Oruvan
 Happy Christmas
2019 Aakasha Ganga 2 as Maanikkasheri Thampuran, Devan's father (Archieve Footage only)
2022 Pathonpatham Noottandu as Diwan Peshkar
2022 Kumari as Velyachan

Television serials
2000 - Snehanjali (Asianet)
2004 - Kadamattathu Kathanar (Asianet)
2017 - Nilavum Nakshtrangalum (Amrita TV)
2018 - CBI Diary (Mazhavil Manorama)
2019-Sumangali Bhava (Zee Keralam)

References

http://spadikam-george-actor.moviedost.com/
http://malayalam.filmychai.com/Spadikam-George/celebrity/view/14226/index.html

External links
 
 Spadikam George at MSI

Living people
Male actors from Kottayam
Male actors in Malayalam cinema
Indian male film actors
Year of birth missing (living people)
20th-century Indian male actors
21st-century Indian male actors
Indian male television actors
Male actors in Malayalam television